The common gallinule (Gallinula galeata) is a bird in the family Rallidae. It was split from the common moorhen by the American Ornithologists' Union in July 2011. It lives around well-vegetated marshes, ponds, canals, and other wetlands in the Americas. The species is not found in the polar regions or many tropical rainforests. Elsewhere, the common gallinule is likely the most commonly seen rail species in much of North America, except for the American coot in some regions.

Description and ecology
The gallinule has dark plumage apart from the white undertail, yellow legs and a red frontal shield. The young are browner and lack the red shield. It has a wide range of gargling calls and will emit loud hisses when threatened.

Measurements:

 Length: 12.6–13.8 in (32–35 cm)
 Weight: 10.9–16.1 oz (310–456 g)
 Wingspan: 21.3–24.4 in (54–62 cm)

This is a common breeding bird in marsh environments and well-vegetated lakes. Populations in areas where the waters freeze, such as southern Canada and the northern USA, will migrate to more temperate climes. This species will consume a wide variety of vegetable material and small aquatic creatures. It forages beside or in the water, sometimes upending in the water to feed. Its wide feet allow it to hop about on lily pads.  It is often secretive, but can become tame in some areas. Despite loss of habitat in parts of its range, the common gallinule remains plentiful and widespread.

The common gallinule will fight to defend its territory. The nest is a basket built on the ground in dense vegetation. Laying starts in spring, between mid-March and mid-May in northern hemisphere temperate regions. About 8 eggs are usually laid per female early in the season; a brood later in the year usually has only 5–8 or even fewer eggs. Nests may be re-used by different females. Incubation lasts about three weeks. Both parents incubate and feed the young. These fledge after 40–50 days, become independent usually a few weeks thereafter, and may raise their first brood the next spring. When threatened, the young may cling to a parent's body, after which the adult birds fly away to safety, carrying their offspring with them.

This species is parasitized by the moorhen flea, Dasypsyllus gallinulae.

Subspecies

Seven subspecies are today considered valid; others have been described that are now considered junior synonyms. Most are not very readily recognizable, as differences are rather subtle and often clinal. Usually, the location of a sighting is the most reliable indication as to subspecies identification, but the migratory tendencies of this species make identifications based on location not completely reliable.

In addition to the extant subspecies listed below, there is a Pleistocene population known from fossils: the larger, stout and long-winged paleosubspecies G. g. brodkorbi is known from the Ichetucknee River deposits in Florida. It was originally described as a distinct species, but is probably the direct ancestor of some of today's common gallinules. The presence in the same deposits of fossils typical of the shorter-winged and more delicate G. g. cerceris suggests that G. g. brodkorbi was not ancestral to the Antillean (Florida) gallinule of our time but rather to the more northerly North American subspecies.

References

Further reading
Dronen, Norman O.; Gardner, Scott L. & Jiménez, F. Agustín (2006): Selfcoelum limnodromi n. gen., n. sp. (Digenea: Cyclocoelidae: Cyclocoelinae) from the long-billed dowitcher, Limnodromus scolopaceus (Charadriiformes: Scolopacidae) from Oklahoma, U.S.A.. Zootaxa 1131: 49–58. PDF fulltext
Olson, Storrs L. (1974): The Pleistocene Rails of North America. Condor 76(2): 169–175. DjVu fulltext PDF fulltext

External links

 Common Gallinule Species Account – Cornell Lab of Ornithology
 Common Moorhen - Gallinula chloropus - USGS Patuxent Bird Identification InfoCenter
 

common gallinule
Birds of the Americas
Birds of the Caribbean
Birds of Hispaniola
Birds of the Dominican Republic
Birds of Haiti
common gallinule